David Thorpe (born  1962) is a British former amateur and professional motocross racer and racing team manager. He won  the AMCA 250 title in 1978 at the age of 16 along with the superclass title the same year competing against the best of the 500cc amateur riders. He competed in the Motocross World Championships from 1983 to 1993. Thorpe is notable for being a three-time FIM 500cc motocross world champion.


Motocross career
Thorpe's early career saw him excel in both motocross and football, and at one stage he was even offered a contract with professional side Queen's Park Rangers, before opting to concentrate on motocross. After a successful early career for the UK Kawasaki team, Thorpe switched to the Honda factory racing team in 1983. He emerged as a regular Grand Prix winner in 1984, and took his first world title in 1985. In this year's Motocross des Nations at Gaildorf in Germany he also took the overall individual win beating American riders Jeff Ward and David Bailey. He retained his world title in 1986, following a season long battle with Honda team-mate André Malherbe.

A series of injuries prevented Thorpe from making a title challenge in 1987 and 1988, where he finished fifth and third respectively in the 500cc FIM World Championship. However, Thorpe won his third title in 1989, following a thrilling season-long battle with Eric Geboers. 1990 saw him move teams to the factory Kawasaki team, however the Kawasaki machine was inferior to the factory Honda, and Thorpe struggled to compete. In 1990 and 1991 he finished fifth and seventh respectively in the 500cc World Championship. Thorpe left Kawasaki in 1991, and moved back to Honda, riding for the Italian 'Cinti Honda' team. He was unable to capture his old form, and retired from professional motocross competition in 1993 at the age of 31. Thorpe remains the last British rider to have won the premier division of the motocross world championships.

Post-Motocross career 
After his competitive career, Thorpe served as manager of the British Motocross des Nations team, which included the upset victory by the 1994 British team of Rob Herring, Paul Malin and Kurt Nicoll. The victory marked the first time a British team had won the event since 1967 and, broke a 13-year American winning streak at the Motocross des Nations. Afterwards, Thorpe concentrated on team management, running the UK based CAT Honda team during the late 1990s. The team was a success both in the UK and on the Grand Prix circuit, however Honda suddenly withdrew their support (along with several other teams) in 2001, and the team disbanded.

In recent years, Thorpe has returned to motocross, although he now competes for fun, competing in his local regional championship with great success. He has also been clerk of the course of the West of England MCC's Patchquick trophy meeting.

In 2007 Thorpe contested the two round, FIM Veterans Motocross World Cup in the senior class. Thorpe won the overall victory at both rounds (Namur, Belgium and Donington Park, Great Britain), giving him his fourth world title.

References 

British motocross riders
Living people
1960s births
Place of birth missing (living people)